A phosphite anion or phosphite in inorganic chemistry usually refers to [HPO3]2− but includes [H2PO3]− ([HPO2(OH)]−).  These anions are the conjugate bases of  phosphorous acid (H3PO3).  The corresponding salts, e.g. sodium phosphite (Na2HPO3) are reducing in character.

Nomenclature
The IUPAC recommended name for phosphorous acid is phosphonic acid.  Correspondingly, the IUPAC-recommended name for the  ion is phosphonate. In the US the IUPAC naming conventions for inorganic compounds are taught at high school, but not as a 'required' part of the curriculum. A well-known university-level textbook follows the IUPAC recommendations.  In practice any reference to "phosphite" should be investigated to determine the naming convention being employed.

Salts containing , called phosphonates or phosphites

From the commercial perspective, the most important phosphite salt is basic lead phosphite. Many salts containing the phosphite ion have been investigated structurally, these include sodium phosphite pentahydrate (Na2HPO3·5H2O). (NH4)2HPO3·H2O, CuHPO3·H2O, SnHPO3 and Al2(HPO3)3·4H2O.

 has a number of canonical resonance forms making it isoelectronic with bisulfite ion, which has a similar structure.

Salts containing HP(O)2OH−
Acid or hydrogen phosphites are called hydrogenphosphonates or acid phosphites.  IUPAC recommends the name hydrogenphosphonates).  They are anions HP(O)2OH−.  Aypical derivative is the salt [NH4][HP(O)2OH]. Many related salts are known, e.g., RbHPHO3, CsHPHO3, TlHPHO3.  These salts are prepared by treating phosphorous acid with the metal carbonate. These compounds contain a layer polymeric anion consisting of HPO3 tetrahedra linked by hydrogen bonds. These layers are interleaved by layers of metal cations.

Organic esters of hydrogen phosphites are anions with the formula HP(O)2OR− (R = organic group).  One commercial example is the fungicide fosetyl-Al with the formula [C2H5OP(H)O2]3Al.

Salts containing , called diphosphites or pyrophosphites
Pyrophosphites (diphosphites) can be produced by gently heating  acid phosphites under reduced pressure. They contain the ion , which can be formulated [HP(O)2O−P(O)2H]2−.

Parallels in arsenic chemistry
An example is Ag3AsO3 as well as the polymeric meta-arsenite . The iso-electronic sulfite ion,  is known from its salts.

Use as fungicides

Inorganic phosphites (containing ) have been applied to crops to combat fungus-like pathogens of the order oomycetes (water molds).  The situation is confusing because of the similarity in name between phosphite and phosphate (a major plant nutrient and fertilizer ingredient), and controversial because phosphites have sometimes been advertised as fertilizers, even though they are converted to phosphate too slowly to serve as a plant's main phosphorus source. In fact, phosphites may cause phytotoxicity when a plant is starved of phosphates. Lemoynie and others have described this complicated situation and noted that calling phosphites fertilizers avoided the regulatory complication and negative public perceptions that might have been incurred by registering them as fungicides.

A major form of inorganic phosphite used in agriculture is monopotassium phosphite. This compound does serve as a potassium fertilizer.

See also
 Hypophosphite – 
 Organophosphorus 
 Phosphine – PH3 and the organic phosphines PR3
 Phosphine oxide – OPR3
 Phosphinite – P(OR)R2
 Phosphonite – P(OR)2R
 Phosphinate – OP(OR)R2
 Phosphonate – organic phosphonates OP(OR)2R
 Phosphate –  
 Organophosphate – OP(OR)3

Further reading

References

Phosphorus oxyanions
Functional groups
Phosphorus(III) compounds